Tephris is a genus of snout moths described by Émile Louis Ragonot in 1890.

Species
Tephris cyriella (Erschoff, 1874)
Tephris melanochreella (Ragonot, 1887)
Tephris nigrisparsella (Ragonot, 1887)
Tephris ochreella Ragonot, 1893
Tephris verruculella (Ragonot, 1887)

References

Phycitini
Pyralidae genera
Taxa named by Émile Louis Ragonot